The 1969 Segunda División de Chile was the 18th season of the Segunda División de Chile.

Lota Schwager was the tournament's champion.

Table

See also
Chilean football league system

References

External links
 RSSSF 1969

Segunda División de Chile (1952–1995) seasons
Primera B
Chil